Johan Brautigam (18 May 1878, Uithoorn - 24 June 1962, Rotterdam) was a Dutch trade unionist and politician.

See also
List of Dutch politicians

1878 births
1962 deaths
People from Uithoorn
Social Democratic Workers' Party (Netherlands) politicians
Dutch trade unionists